The William Hamilton House is a historic house in Bellevue, Nebraska. It was built in 1856 for Reverend William Hamilton, a Presbyterian minister. It was designed with Greek Revival features like "the low pitch of roof, the design of the windows, and the use of cornice boards and cornice returns." It has been listed on the National Register of Historic Places since October 15, 1969.

References

		
National Register of Historic Places in Sarpy County, Nebraska
Greek Revival architecture in Nebraska
Houses completed in 1856
1856 establishments in Nebraska Territory